Charles George Bluhdorn (born Karl Georg Blühdorn; September 20, 1926 – February 19, 1983) was an Austrian-born American industrialist.

Early life
Bluhdorn was born in Vienna, Austria, to an Austrian Jewish mother Rosa Fuchs and father Paul Blühdorn. Per Who's Who in Ridgefield (CT), he was considered such a "hellion" that his father sent the 11-year-old to an English boarding school for disciplining. At 16, he moved to New York, studying at City College of New York and Columbia University.

Career 
In 1946, Bluhdorn went to work at the Cotton Exchange, earning $15 a week. Other accounts say that he emigrated to the United States in 1942 and served in the U.S. Army Air Forces.

Details of his upbringing are unknown, but Vanity Fair reported that: "Truth be told, Charlie wasn't elucidative about a lot of things, including whether he was Jewish, which he kept Hollywood guessing about by posting a sentry outside the men's room door."

Gulf & Western
In 1956, Bluhdorn acquired Michigan Plating and Stamping, a small auto parts company that eventually grew into Gulf and Western Industries, a conglomerate that ranked 61st in the Fortune 500 by 1981. According to Robert Evans, in 1970 Bluhdorn had told him: "Imagine, twelve years ago I was walking the streets selling typewriters door to door."
 
Holdings of Gulf + Western were blue-chip names such as Paramount Pictures, Madison Square Garden, Simon & Schuster, and the Consolidated Cigar Corporation, as well as less glamorous assets such as the South Puerto Rico Sugar Company and New Jersey Zinc. 

Paramount was suggested to Bluhdorn by Sumner Redstone and the acquisition was encouraged by Paramount's head of publicity, Martin Davis. It was during Gulf + Western's ownership of Paramount that it went from being number nine at the box office based upon total receipt sales, to number one. After the marketing success of Love Story in 1970, Bluhdorn appointed Frank Yablans as president of the studio and Robert Evans as head of production. Together they oversaw the studio in its heyday, releasing such hits as The Godfather, The Godfather Part II , Chinatown.

In 1974, Bluhdorn stepped down as Chairman of Paramount and hired Barry Diller as Paramount's chairman and chief executive, making Diller, at age 32, the youngest studio chief in history and the first to come from the TV business.

Dominican Republic
Bluhdorn was very aware of the financial potential of the Dominican Republic and invested a significant amount of resources into its social and economic development. Bluhdorn is credited as being the father of the Dominican tourism industry.

In 1967, Gulf + Western paid $54 million for South Puerto Rico Sugar Company. Nearly half of the land was used to produce sugar cane and, at the peak of the cane-cutting season, the company employed 19,000 people, making it the country's largest private employer as well as the largest taxpayer and landowner.

Gulf + Western acquired Consolidated Cigar in 1968 and shifted the Canary Island cigar-making operation to La Romana. It also established Cofinasa, a Dominican finance company.

As Gulf + Western had purchased Paramount in 1966, Bluhdorn had plans to turn the island into a moviemaking mecca. To sell the idea he constantly invited producers, directors, writers and movie stars, to get them to appreciate the natural beauty of the country.

 The Godfather Part II (1974) – The scenes that took place in Cuba were shot in Santo Domingo.
 Sorcerer (1977) – Produced under rugged conditions in the jungles of the Dominican Republic. 
 Apocalypse Now (1979) – Some scenes were filmed on the Chavón River.

In 1975, Gulf + Western developed  of the sugar mill's land into the Casa de Campo resort. Casa de Campo is home to three internationally renowned golf courses designed by Pete Dye – Teeth of the Dog, Dye Fore and Links.

One of Bluhdorn's Dominican friends, Oscar de la Renta, was hired to do interior design for Casa De Campo and licensed his men's wear line through Kayser-Roth.

Kayser-Roth (a division of Gulf + Western), owned the Miss Universe pageant via its acquisition of Pacific Mills. Pacific Mills had invented the pageant to sell its Catalina Swimwear brand. Miss Universe 1977 was held in the Dominican Republic to promote tourism on the island.

Former Paramount Studios set designer Roberto Copa designed the artist village of Altos de Chavón in 1976 and it was built by Bluhdorn in the early 1980s. Bluhdorn's daughter, Dominique Bluhdorn, is the current president of the Altos de Chavón Cultural Center.

Altos de Chavón also has a 5,000 seat open air Greek style amphitheatre, which was inaugurated in 1982 by Frank Sinatra with the Concert for the Americas. Bluhdorn had Paramount Pictures record the concert, which was shown all over the world. Viewers 
could see the Altos de Chavón artist village, the beauty of the landscapes, beaches and 
golf courses of Casa de Campo.

Personal life
Charles married Yvette M. LeMarrec, formerly of Paris, in the 1950s.

Bluhdorn was known to be a tireless executive once dubbed "The Mad Austrian of Wall Street." He maintained his position as chairman of Gulf + Western Industries until his death.  He was also infamous (and widely imitated) for his cement-thick Austro-German accent, which has been lampooned in interviews by former collaborators such as Francis Ford Coppola and Robert Evans.

He died at age 56 of a heart attack on his corporate jet while returning home to New York City from his Casa de Campo resort in the Dominican Republic on February 19, 1983.

His private funeral services were held at St. Mary's Church in Ridgefield, Connecticut. Among those who attended was friend and former Secretary of State Henry Kissinger.

Personal properties 
Casa de Campo, an hour away from Santo Domingo, was a  exclusive retreat founded by Bluhdorn in 1974. After his death, the property was sold in 1984 to the Fanjul brothers of Palm Beach, Florida, and opened to paying guests.

In February 2007, the Bedford, New York estate of his late wife, Yvette, was put on the market for the highest price ever asked for a Westchester County residence.

Legacy
In 1983, Donald Gaston established the Charles G. Bluhdorn Prize in Economics at Tufts University in Boston in memory of Bluhdorn.  It is awarded annually to an undergraduate majoring in economics who has demonstrated outstanding scholastic ability.

Bluhdorn's tumultuous relationship with Paramount executive Robert Evans was documented in Evans's 1994 biographical book The Kid Stays in the Picture and in the 2002 film of the same title, as well as the 2022 series The Offer, where Bluhdorn is portrayed by Burn Gorman.

The 1990 film The Godfather Part III was dedicated to Bluhdorn, "who inspired it."

The Charles G. & Yvette Bluhdorn Charitable Trust was a multi-million dollar charity overseen by their children. Between 2007 and 2013 the fund was spent down and as of 2019 lists less than $3,000 in assets.

Further reading

References

External links
 

American financial businesspeople
Austrian businesspeople
1926 births
1983 deaths
Gulf and Western Industries
Austrian emigrants to the United States
American people of Austrian-Jewish descent
People from Ridgefield, Connecticut
20th-century American businesspeople
Paramount Pictures executives
City College of New York alumni
Columbia University alumni
Presidents of Paramount Pictures